Gazeran (also Romanized as Gāzerān; also known as Gazrah and Kāzerūn) is a village in Farmahin Rural District, in the Central District of Farahan County, Markazi Province, Iran. At the 2006 census, its population was 209, in 52 families.

References 

Populated places in Farahan County